Dylan is a 1964 play by Sidney Michaels.

Production
Dylan is based on the books Dylan Thomas in America (1956) by John Malcolm Brinnin and Leftover Life to Kill (1957) by Caitlin Thomas. The play covers the final years of Welsh poet Dylan Thomas' life.

At the 18th Tony Awards, Dylan was nominated for Best Play, and earned Alec Guinness (in the title role) the award for best performance. He was also awarded the Delia Austrian medal for his role. The play was recorded and released by Columbia Masterworks.

References

External links
 

Broadway plays
1964 plays
Cultural depictions of Dylan Thomas